Tango Bourges Basket (formerly Cercle Jean-Macé Bourges Basket) is a French women's basketball club from Bourges.

Bourges was the first French team to win a FIBA women's competition, the 1995 Ronchetti Cup. So began the club's most successful years to date ranging between 1995 and 2001, with three Euroleagues and six national championships in a row. A regular in the Euroleague, since 2006 Bourges has won four more championships, most recently in 2013.

Titles
 Euroleague
 1997, 1998, 2001
 Ronchetti Cup
 1995
 EuroCup Women
 Winners (2): 2015–16, 2021–22
 FIBA Europe SuperCup Women
 Winners (1): 2022
 Ligue Féminine
 1995, 1996, 1997, 1998, 1999, 2000, 2006, 2008, 2009, 2011, 2012, 2013, 2015, 2018, 2022
 Coupe de France
 1990, 1991, 2005, 2006, 2008, 2009, 2010, 2014, 2017, 2018, 2019
 Tournoi de la Fédération
 1996, 1999, 2000, 2001, 2006, 2007, 2008
 Match des Champions
 2014, 2015

Current roster

Notable players

References

External links
 Official website

Bourges
Bourges
Bourges
Basketball teams established in 1967